"You and I" is a duet recorded by American country music artists Eddie Rabbitt and Crystal Gayle. It was written by Frank J. Myers, produced by David Malloy, and released in October 1982 as the first single from Rabbitt's eighth studio album Radio Romance (1982). "You and I" became a major country pop crossover hit for both artists.

Track listing
7" single
 "You And I" – 3:58
 "All My Life, All My Love" – 2:44

Critical reception
In 2005, the song was ranked number seven on CMT's 100 Greatest Duets in Country Music. Gayle performed the duet with Raul Malo of The Mavericks since Rabbitt had died of lung cancer in 1998.
"You and I" went to number one on the US Billboard Country chart for one week.
On the Billboard Hot 100, the song spent 29 weeks on the chart, peaking at number seven, and making it the 12th biggest song of the year.

Charts

In popular culture
The song was used for the 1984 wedding of Greg Nelson and Jenny Gardner on the American soap opera All My Children.

The US musical television series Glee covered this song in a mash-up with the Lady Gaga's same titled song in the third season episode "Mash Off" (2011). American sitcom 30 Rock covered the song when Jenna (Jane Krakowski) practised and sang it with contestant Brock (Tyler Merna) on the Live Results Show of America's Kidz Got Singing at the end of the sixth season episode, "Hey, Baby, What's Wrong, Part 2" (2012).

References

External links
 

1982 songs
1982 singles
Eddie Rabbitt songs
Crystal Gayle songs
Songs written by Frank J. Myers
Male–female vocal duets
Song recordings produced by David Malloy
Elektra Records singles
1980s ballads